Magali Rousseau (born 10 March 1988) is a French swimmer, who specialized in butterfly events. She represented her nation France in the 200 m butterfly at the 2008 Summer Olympics, and has been a member of Canet 66 in Canet-en-Roussillon throughout her swimming career under the tutelage of her coach Philippe Lucas. Rousseau is the daughter of three-time Olympic freestyle swimmer Michel Rousseau.

Rousseau competed as a lone French swimmer in the women's 200 m butterfly at the 2008 Summer Olympics in Beijing. Leading up to the Games, she topped the field with a personal best of 2:10.07 to eclipse both the nation's own Olympic standard and the FINA A-cut (2:10.84) at the French Championships in Dunkirk. Swimming on the far outside in heat three, Rousseau chased the rest of the swimmers throughout the race to round out the field with a seventh-place time in 2:13.12. Rousseau failed to advance to the semifinals, as she placed twenty-eighth overall in the prelims.

Rousseau is a very successful World Games athlete. In 2013, she won four gold medals and one bronze in life saving. In 2017, she won another gold medal in lifesaving.

References

External links
 
 
 
 
 
 
 

1988 births
Living people
French female butterfly swimmers
Olympic swimmers of France
Swimmers at the 2008 Summer Olympics
Sportspeople from Neuilly-sur-Seine
World Games gold medalists
World Games silver medalists
World Games bronze medalists
Competitors at the 2013 World Games
Competitors at the 2017 World Games
Competitors at the 2022 World Games
French lifesaving athletes
20th-century French women
21st-century French women